The Samboy Lim Philippine Basketball Association (PBA) Sportsmanship award (formerly known as the PBA Sportsmanship award) is an annual Philippine Basketball Association (PBA) award given since the 1993 PBA season, to the player who most "exemplifies the ideals of sportsmanship on the court—ethical behavior, fair play and integrity". 

Since its inception in 1993, the award has been given to 19 different players and was won thrice by Rey Evangelista, Freddie Abuda and Gabe Norwood. The award was renamed on October 6, 2016 after Samboy Lim, the first recipient of this award.

Winners

Multiple time winners

Sportsmanship Award
Sportsmanship trophies and awards
Awards established in 1993
1993 establishments in the Philippines